Jude Menezes (born 5 August 1971 in Mumbai, Maharashtra) is a former Indian field hockey goalkeeper who is currently the head coach of the Japan women's team. He also served as the goalkeeping coach of the Blacks Sticks Women's Team and the head coach of Auckland Women's Hockey Team. Jude represented India at 133 international matches, prominent among them the 2000 Summer Olympics in Sydney, Australia, 1998 Hockey World Cup at Utrecht, Holland and 2002 World Cup at Kuala Lumpur, Malaysia. He moved to New Zealand in 2002 and is coaching field hockey teams at the highest level.

Domestic hockey career

Menezes represented and captained Mumbai Hockey at sub junior, junior and senior level at the Nationals. He represented Tata Sports Club, Mahindra & Mahindra and Bharat Petroleum Corporation Limited at the Super League and National tournaments. Menezes at the age of 19 was awarded the Best Goalkeeper at the prestigious Nehru Cup in 1989.

International hockey career

Menezes made his international debut for India in 1992 at the Junior World Cup at Kula Lumpur and went on to play 133 international caps until he retired in 2002.

Career highlights

 Olympics – Sep 2000 – Sydney
 World Cup – Feb/Mar 2002 - Kuala Lumpur
 World Cup May 1998 – Utrecht
 Commonwealth Games – Sep 1998 – Kuala Lumpur (4th)
 Sultan Azlan Shah Cup – Feb 2000 – Kuala Lumpur (3rd)
 Prime Minister's Gold Cup – Mar 2001 – Dhaka (1st); saved two penalty strokes in tie-breaker in final
 Champions Challenge – Nov 2001 – Kuala Lumpur India (1st)

In 2001 Menezes was awarded the prestigious Shiv Chhatrapati sports award by the Government of Maharashtra.

Coaching career

Menezes moved to New Zealand in 2002 and worked full-time in the health and fitness industry and also coached field hockey teams. Since 2014 he is a full-time field hockey coach.

Menezes's coaching career:

On 2 November 2021, he became the head coach of the Japanese Women Hockey team 

2015    GK Coach of NZ Women's National Team
　　　 (2nd in World League Final, 2nd in Oceania Cup)
2016    GK Coach and Team Manager of NZ Women's National Team
            4th in Rio de Janeiro Olympic Games
2017    GK Coach and Team Manager of NZ Women's National Team
　　     (2nd in Oceania Cup, 42th in World League, 33rd World League)
2018    GK Coach and Team Manager of NZ Women's National Team
　　 　(Champion in Commonwealth Games, Participation in World Cup)
　　　 Assistant Coach of NZ U21 Men's National Team (Participation in Sultan Johor Cup)
2019-2021 Assistant Coach of NZ Women's National Team
　　　 (Champion in 2020 Oceania Cup, 8th in Tokyo 2020 Olympic Games)
 Nov 2014 Black Sticks women's goal keeping coach,  Champions Trophy - Mendoza Argentina: 4th Place.
 Oct 2014 Black Sticks under 21 head coach, 5 Test Series versus India – New Zealand: 3-0 Series winners.
 Sep 2014 Black Sticks women's goal keeping coach, 6 Test Series versus USA – New Zealand.
 July 2014 Black Sticks women's goal keeping coach, XIV Commonwealth Games – Glasgow UK: Bronze medal.
 August  2014  Auckland women's team head coach, 2014 Ford NHL Championships – Auckland : Champions.
 July 2013 Auckland women's team head coach, 2013 Ford NHL Championships – Auckland : 3rd Place.
 July 2012 Auckland women's team goalkeeping/assistant coach, 2012 Ford NHL Championships – Auckland : 2nd Place.
 2012–2013 Pukekohe Indians Sports Club, head coach. 2004–2005 Auckland Indian Sports Club, head coach
 2004–2005 Auckland Indian Sports Club, head coach

References

 Jude Menezes at bharatiyahockey.org
 Bharatiya Hockey

External links

1971 births
Living people
Field hockey players from Maharashtra
Field hockey players at the 2000 Summer Olympics
Olympic field hockey players of India
Indian field hockey coaches
Recipients of the Arjuna Award
Indian male field hockey players
1998 Men's Hockey World Cup players
2002 Men's Hockey World Cup players
Male field hockey goalkeepers